Maryland Route 332 (MD 332) is a state highway in the U.S. state of Maryland. Known for most of its length as Central Avenue, the highway runs  from Southern Avenue at the District of Columbia boundary in Capitol Heights east to MD 214 in Seat Pleasant. MD 332 is the old alignment of MD 214 through Capitol Heights. The highway was constructed in the mid-1910s and bypassed when East Capitol Street was extended east out of Washington, D.C. to Seat Pleasant in the late 1960s.

Route description

MD 332 begins at Central Avenue's intersection with Southern Avenue at the District of Columbia boundary. Central Avenue continues west into the Capitol View neighborhood of Washington, D.C., where it intersects East Capitol Street. MD 332 heads east as a two-lane undivided road through the town of Capitol Heights. In the center of town, the highway intersects Larchmont Avenue and Chamber Avenue; the latter leads north to the Capitol Heights station on the Washington Metro's Blue and Silver lines. MD 332 exits the town beyond Tunic Street and continues toward a tangent junction with MD 214. West of the merge, the highway intersects an unnamed spur, MD 332A, that provides full access between MD 332 and MD 214 (East Capitol Street). MD 332 continues as Old Central Avenue and becomes one-way with one eastbound lane just before merging with eastbound MD 214 (Central Avenue) on the southern edge of the city of Seat Pleasant.

History
Central Avenue was paved from Southern Avenue through Capitol Heights to Seat Pleasant as a  concrete road in 1914. This road later became the westernmost portion of MD 214. MD 214 was widened to  through Capitol Heights and Seat Pleasant by 1934. MD 214 was relocated from Southern Avenue to Seat Pleasant as an extension of East Capitol Street in 1969. The segment of the highway through Capitol Heights was designated MD 332 by 1970.

Junction list

Auxiliary route
MD 332A is the designation for the  two-lane undivided connector between MD 214 and MD 332 in Seat Pleasant. MD 332A was assigned to this pre-existing connector in 2008.

See also

References

External links

MDRoads: MD 332

332
Maryland Route 332